Rup Lal is an Indian molecular biologist known for his work in molecular biology, genomics, metagenomics and taxonomy of microbial diversity inhabiting extreme niches. His research has led to the development of novel analogue of rifamycin, identification and functional characterization of  microbial communities at Manikaran hotsprings and deciphering the role of microbes in degradation of  Hexacholorocyclohexane (HCH) at a polluted dumpsite located at Ummari village, Lucknow, India.  He has over 35 years of strong and longstanding experience in administration, teaching and research in various capacities at University of Delhi, India. Presently, he is NASI Senior Scientist Platinum Jubilee fellow at The Energy and Resources Institute (TERI), Delhi.

He is a fellow of the National Academy of Sciences, India, Fellow of Indian National Science Academy, Fellow of National Academy of Agricultural Sciences.

References

Indian molecular biologists
Year of birth missing (living people)
Living people